The enzyme [acetyl-CoA carboxylase]-phosphatase (EC 3.1.3.44) catalyzes the reaction 

[acetyl-CoA carboxylase] phosphate + HO  [acetyl-CoA carboxylase] + phosphate

This enzyme belongs to the family of hydrolases, specifically those acting on phosphoric monoester bonds.  The systematic name is [acetyl-CoA:carbon-dioxide ligase (ADP-forming)]-phosphate phosphohydrolase.

References 

 

EC 3.1.3
Enzymes of unknown structure